Sarah Jane Oates is violinist and associate leader at the Philharmonia Orchestra in London, United Kingdom

Background
Oates was born in Johannesburg, South Africa on 26 June 1976. Her family then moved to Durbanville, Western Cape, South Africa. At the age of nine she started with lessons at the Hugo Lambrechts Music Centre in Parow, South Africa. Louis van der Watt was her teacher.

Education
Oates matriculated at Fairmont High. She went to London, UK to study at  Purcell School of Music after she received a bursary in 1992. Yossi Zivoni was the teacher. After that she went to the Royal Northern College of Music in  Manchester, UK. She moved to the United States and studied under Pinchas Zukerman at the Manhattan School of Music. She was later taught by Alexander Kerr

Performances
Oates performed with various groups. At the Santa Fe chamber music festival  her performing career started. This was in New Mexico. She has performed violin concertos with:
 The London Philharmonia Chamber Ensemble
 Cape Town Philharmonic Orchestra
 Holland Symfonia
 Natal Philharmonic
 The Royal Flemish Philharmonic
 RNCM Symphony Orchestra
2015 — Performed in the opening concert of the new Philharmonia Chamber Music Series in the Royal Festival Hall, London

Leading positions
 2008 to 2013  -Concertmaster of the Holland Symfonia Orchestra in Amsterdam
 2013  to current -The second concertmaster of the Philharmonia Orchestra, London

Other
Oates is a member of the Devich Piano Trio. The trio is:

 Hanna Devich, Hungaria, Piano
 Jasper Havelaar, Netherlands, Cello
 Oates as a violinist

She is also a part writer of Music books.

References 

Manhattan School of Music
1976 births
Living people
South African classical musicians